The 2020 Super Start Batteries 400 presented by O'Reilly Auto Parts was a NASCAR Cup Series race that was originally scheduled to be held on May 31, 2020 and was rescheduled to July 23, 2020, at Kansas Speedway in Kansas City, Kansas. Contested over 267 laps, on the 1.5 mile (2.4 km) asphalt speedway, it will be the 19th race of the 2020 NASCAR Cup Series season.

Report

Background

Kansas Speedway is a  tri-oval race track in Kansas City, Kansas. It was built in 2001 and hosts two annual NASCAR race weekends. The NTT IndyCar Series also raced there until 2011. The speedway is owned and operated by the International Speedway Corporation.

Entry list
 (R) denotes rookie driver.
 (i) denotes driver who are ineligible for series driver points.

Qualifying
Kevin Harvick was awarded the pole for the race as determined by a random draw.

Starting Lineup

Race

Stage Results

Stage One
Laps: 80

Stage Two
Laps: 80

Final Stage Results

Stage Three
Laps: 107

Race statistics
 Lead changes: 22 among 9 different drivers
 Cautions/Laps: 11 for 47
 Red flags: 1 for 2 minutes and 45 seconds
 Time of race: 3 hours, 17 minutes and 14 seconds
 Average speed:

Media

Television
NBC Sports covered the race on the television side. Rick Allen, Jeff Burton, Steve Letarte and Dale Earnhardt Jr. covered the race from the booth at Charlotte Motor Speedway. Parker Kligerman and Kelli Stavast handled the pit road duties on site, and Marty Snider handled the features from the RCR shop during the race.

Radio
MRN had the radio call for the race which was also simulcast on Sirius XM NASCAR Radio. Alex Hayden and Jeff Striegle called the race in the booth when the field raced through the tri-oval. Dave Moody covered the race from the Sunoco spotters stand outside turn 2 when the field was racing through turns 1 and 2. Kurt Becker called the race from a platform outside turn 4. Winston Kelley and Steve Post worked pit road for the radio side.

Standings after the race

Drivers' Championship standings

Manufacturers' Championship standings

Note: Only the first 16 positions are included for the driver standings.
. – Driver has clinched a position in the NASCAR Cup Series playoffs.

References

2020 in sports in Kansas
2020 NASCAR Cup Series
Super Start Batteries 400
NASCAR races at Kansas Speedway
Motorsport events postponed due to the COVID-19 pandemic